Alfredo Piedra Mora (16 August 1915 – 18 December 2003) was a Costa Rican footballer and manager.

Playing career

Club
Piedra made his debut for Orión on 24 May 1936 against Herediano, immediately scoring two goals. He went on to win two league titles with them and also played for Sociedad Gimnástica Española, La Libertad (winning another title) and Cuban team Juventud Asturiana.

He was joint league top goalscorer in 1938 with 11 goals and totalled 124 Primera División matches.

International
He made his debut for Costa Rica playing alongside other Costa Rican greats like Hernán Bolaños and Alejandro Morera Soto in a February 1938 Central American and Caribbean Games match against Panama, scoring a goal in which proved to be his sole international game.

International goals
Scores and results list Costa Rica's goal tally first.

Managerial
As a manager, Piedra was in charge of teams like Orión, Saprissa (twice), Alajuelense (also twice), Cartaginés (5 times), Barrio México, Herediano, San Ramón, San Carlos, Puntarenas, Rohrmoser and in Mexico with Monarcas Morelia. He also managed the national team on three occasions, winning the 1963 CONCACAF Championship.

In total, Piedra was in charge at 356 Primera División matches and 49 times with the national team.

Achievements
As player
 League title - Orión (1938, 1944) (top goalscorer in 1938)
 League title - La Libertad (1946)
Central American and Caribbean Games Silver Medal (1): 1938

As manager
 League title - Saprissa (1962)
 1955 CCCF Championship - Costa Rica
 1963 CONCACAF Championship - Costa Rica

References 

1915 births
2003 deaths
Footballers from San José, Costa Rica
Association football forwards
Costa Rican footballers
Costa Rica international footballers
Costa Rican expatriate footballers
Expatriate footballers in Cuba
Costa Rican expatriate sportspeople in Cuba
Costa Rican football managers
Liga FPD players
Costa Rica national football team managers
Deportivo Saprissa managers
L.D. Alajuelense managers
C.S. Herediano managers
Central American and Caribbean Games silver medalists for Costa Rica
Competitors at the 1938 Central American and Caribbean Games
Central American and Caribbean Games medalists in football